Rouse Simmons (September 10, 1832 – September 10, 1897) was an American politician and businessman.

Background
Born in Marcy, New York, Simmons moved to Kenosha, Wisconsin in 1849. He was a merchant and was in the insurance and real estate business. His brother was Zalmon G. Simmons. Simmons served on the Kenosha County, Wisconsin Board of Supervisors. In 1875, Simmons served in the Wisconsin State Assembly as a Republican. He died in Kenosha, Wisconsin.

Legacy
The schooner Rouse Simmons was named after Simmons.

Notes

1832 births
1897 deaths
People from Oneida County, New York
Politicians from Kenosha, Wisconsin
Businesspeople from Wisconsin
County supervisors in Wisconsin
Republican Party members of the Wisconsin State Assembly
19th-century American politicians
19th-century American businesspeople